Robinson Township may refer to:

Canada 
 Robinson Township, Ontario

United States 
 Robinson Township, Crawford County, Illinois
 Robinson Township, Posey County, Indiana
 Robinson Township, Brown County, Kansas
 Robinson Township, Ottawa County, Michigan
 Robinson Township, Kidder County, North Dakota, in Kidder County, North Dakota
 Robinson Township, Allegheny County, Pennsylvania
 Robinson Township, Washington County, Pennsylvania

Township name disambiguation pages